Bristol is the main settlement in the town of Bristol in Addison County, Vermont, United States, and a census-designated place (CDP). The population was 1,936 at the 2020 census, out of a total population of 3,782 in the town of Bristol.

Geography
The Bristol CDP is located in the northwest part of the town of Bristol, on the north side of the New Haven River as it exits the Green Mountains to the east. Vermont Route 17 passes through the community, leading west  to U.S. Route 7 at New Haven Junction and east across the Green Mountains through Appalachian Gap  to Waitsfield. Vermont Route 116 runs with VT 17 through Bristol but leads north  to Starksboro and south  to East Middlebury.

References

Census-designated places in Vermont
Census-designated places in Addison County, Vermont